WMYP (98.3 FM) is a radio station licensed to serve Frederiksted, U.S. Virgin Islands.  The station is owned by Amanda Friedman.  It airs a Spanish/Tropical/Variety format.

The Federal Communications Commission assigned the WPPD call letters to this station on April 27, 1998. This call sign was short-lived as the station switched to WREY on March 1, 1999 then switched again to the current WMYP call letters on December 3, 1999.

Ownership
In July 2006, Amanda Friedman agreed to buy WMYP from Juan Padin and Jose Martinez (dba J&J Broadcasters) for a reported $350,000. Friedman is the wife of Jonathan K. Cohen who owns several other radio stations in the U.S. Virgin Islands.

References

External links
 
 
 

MYP
Spanish-language radio stations in the United States
Tropical music radio stations
Radio stations established in 1998
1998 establishments in the United States Virgin Islands
Variety radio stations in the United States
Saint Croix, U.S. Virgin Islands